The 1956–57 season was Port Vale's 45th season of football in the English Football League, and their third successive season (thirty-second overall) in the Second Division. An unmitigated disaster from start to finish, they were relegated in bottom place with just 22 points from 42 games. It was the end of an era, as the reputation of 'the Steele Curtain' had taken a severe blow, and its architect Freddie Steele left the club in January. The season was considered to be one where the old guard 'cracked', and thus many loyal servants of the club were let go in the summer of 1957, including Ray King, Reg Potts, Stan Turner, Tommy Cheadle, and Stan Smith.

Three still-standing but unwanted club-records were set this season: a record 28 defeats in 42 matches, and a 22 game streak without a clean sheet (22 September 1956 to 23 February 1957), and a losing streak of nine straight games (9 March 1957 to 20 April 1957).

Overview

Second Division
The pre-season saw the arrival of Harry Anders, a winger from Manchester City signed for 'a substantial fee'.

The season started with Anders and Baily up front, a combination which failed during a goalless draw with Barnsley. Two losses followed in which eight goals were conceded. Harry Poole replaced Albert Leake in what was 'one of the few rays of sunlight in an otherwise gloomy beginning'. Vale then 'clicked into gear', picking up seven points out of a possible ten in September. This included a 4–2 win at Ewood Park, their last away win of the campaign. Injuries then ravaged the squad as Vale went on a sequence of eight straight defeats to take them from fourteenth to second from bottom. These included losses at the City Ground, Victoria Ground (in the first ever floodlit game in the Potteries), and Anfield. In October, Baily was sold to Nottingham Forest for £7,000 – exactly what Vale had paid for him earlier in the year. Baily had failed to fit in with the team, and was seen as too individualist. The next month Steele bought experienced forward Billy Spurdle from Manchester City for £4,000. He scored on his debut in a 3–2 win over Bury, and two weeks later he scored a brace in a 4–2 win over Doncaster Rovers. This temporarily took them away from relegation worries before a streak of seven games without victory.

On 15 January, Steele resigned, saying "I am quite prepared to face the consequences". On 2 February, Nottingham Forest travelled to Vale Park with Eddie Baily, and demolished Vale 7–1 in a record defeat for the club at the stadium. A week later, the "Valiants" put three past Fulham at Craven Cottage, but failed to pick up any points as Ray King conceded six goals despite a brilliant performance. On 18 February, 42-year-old Norman Low of Workington Town took the £2,000 a year job as Vale manager. Low had no interest in the tactics of the opposition, and simply told his players to 'entertain the public'. He was confident the players at his disposal could reach safety, despite the difficult situation they found themselves in. His first match in charge saw a 3–0 win over Grimsby Town which took them out of the relegation zone. Yet what followed was a club-record nine game losing streak that doomed their season, five of which were played in Burslem. Low experimented with his team by dropping King and Roy Sproson (on a run of 128 consecutive appearances), but all that resulted was a 6–0 hammering from Sheffield United. However it was their 1–0 defeat at Gigg Lane to struggling Bury that did more damage to their prospects of survival. During this spell Reg Potts made his 166th consecutive appearance, though Low put young reserves into the fray after all seemed lost. After relegation was confirmed, Vale seemed to play better with the pressure lifted, and picked up five points in their last three games, including a 2–2 draw at home to rivals Stoke City. Low also announced his plans to rebuild the club, initiating a lengthy series of schoolboy trials.

They finished bottom of the table with 22 points, losing 18 of their 21 away games. They were eight points short of third-from-bottom Notts County. Their 57 goals scored was greater only than Lincoln City, whilst 'the Steele Curtain' was broken, conceding 101 goals, fewer than only two Football League clubs (Charlton Athletic and Crewe Alexandra). Top scorer Cyril Done only score nine goals, as no consistent scorer emerged all season long.

Finances
On the financial side, 105,000 spectators had been lost from the previous season to an average of only 14,046, leaving an income from gate receipts of £40,717. Despite this a profit of £1,268 was recorded. This occurred because of a wage budget cut of around £8,000 to £20,684 and a transfer credit of £625. The club's debts were worrying however, causing the club's directors to funnel £2,500 of their own resources towards repaying this debt. A clear-out of players was initiated for the first time in a good while, those departing included: Cyril Done (Winsford United); Ray King (sold to Boston United for £2,500); Reg Potts and Stan Turner (Worcester City); Tommy Cheadle, Stan Smith, and Derek Mountford (Crewe Alexandra); Len Stephenson and Billy Spurdle (Oldham Athletic); and Harry Anders (Accrington Stanley). Though many of these were some of the club's best players, many had also reached retirement age. Low admitted that he would have to buy young players to fill the vacancies in the first team.

Cup competitions
In the FA Cup, Vale drew 3–3 with Barnsley at Oakwell, before losing the replay 1–0.

League table

Results
Port Vale's score comes first

Football League Second Division

Results by matchday

Matches

FA Cup

Player statistics

Appearances

Top scorers

Transfers

Transfers in

Transfers out

References
Specific

General

Port Vale F.C. seasons
Port Vale